Guess was a Taiwanese television variety show, hosted by Jacky Wu and other hosts, that began on 4 July 1996 and ended its run on 18 August 2012. It was broadcast in Taiwan, weekly on Saturdays from 22:00 to 00:00 on free-to-air China Television (CTV) (中視) and syndicated to be broadcast in Singapore weekly on Saturdays 23:30 on free-to-air MediaCorp Channel U and Malaysia's 8TV weekly on Sundays 17:00 to 18:30.

The show was twice nominated for Best Variety Programme and hosts Jacky Wu and Aya won Best Host in a Variety Programme from two nominations, at the Golden Bell Awards.

History
Guess started on 4 July 1996 as 我猜我猜我猜猜猜, but suffered low viewer ratings initially (apart from its pilot episode), until Jacky Wu took over the helm as the main male host on 21 March 1998. He has been the main host since, while his 2 female co-hosts have changed throughout the years. Former female hosts include Barbie Shu (aka Da S), Dee Shu (aka Xiao S), Matilda Tao, Aya Liu (柳翰雅), Rainie Yang, S.H.E (Selina Ren, Hebe Tian and Ella Chen), Linda Jian (蝴蝶姐姐), and Yao Yao (郭書瑤).

Wu left the show on 3 July 2010, and hosting duties was taken up by Harlem Yu and Selina Jen. However, due to Selina's filming accident in October 2010, Chen Han-dian and Amber An filled in as co-hosts. Yu left the show on 28 January 2011 and the show went on a short hiatus. It relaunched with the new name on 12 March 2011, with Jacky Wu returning to the show as the main host and joined by Patty Hou as his new co-host. The show ended its 16-year run with more than 800 episodes on 18 August 2012.

While the show was still running in Taiwan, the production and writing staff were also working on the "talk" show Kangxi Lai Le, a variety show composed of star-studded topical and comedic interviews.

Hosts
 4 July 1996 - 14 March 1998: Lung Shao-hua, Barbie Shu and Dee Shu
 21 March 1998 - October 2000: Jacky Wu, Barbie Shu and Dee Shu
 December 2000 - March 2001: Jacky Wu and Matilda Tao
 17 April 2001 - 26 January 2002: Jacky Wu, Aya Liu (阿雅 aka 柳翰雅) and Dee Shu
 2 February 2002 - July 2002: Jacky Wu, Aya Liu and S.H.E
 September 2002 - May 2006: Jacky Wu, Aya Liu and Rainie Yang
 May 2006 - 27 January 2007: Jacky Wu, Rainie Yang and a substitute host
 3 February - 14 July 2007: Jacky Wu, Hebe Tien and Selina Jen
 21 July - 22 September 2007: Jacky Wu and two substitute hosts
 29 September 2007 - 6 December 2008: Jacky Wu,  Aya Liu and a substitute host
 13 December 2008 - 9 January 2010: Jacky Wu, Aya Liu and Linda Jian (蝴蝶姐姐)
 16 January 2010 - 10 April 2010: Jacky Wu, Aya Liu and Kuo Shu-yao
 17 April - 3 July: 2010:  Jacky Wu and two substitute hosts
 24 July - 30 October 2010: Harlem Yu and Selina Jen
 5 November 2010 – 28 January 2011: Harlem Yu, Chen Han Dian (陳漢典) and Amber An 
 12 March 2011 - 18 August 2012: Jacky Wu and Patty Hou - relaunched with new name

Segments
Each show usually consists of 2 segments: "The truth cannot be faked" 真的假不了 and "Do not judge a book by its cover" 人不可貌相, but occasionally, especially during festivals, there will be specially organized segments.

In the first segment, "The truth cannot be faked", four people will be invited, each claiming to be able to accomplish something seemingly unbelievable. However, only three of them are telling the truth. Invited celebrities will then have to distinguish ("guess") the one who is lying; if they fail to guess correctly, they will be sprayed with cold mist (dry ice).

In the second segment, "Do not judge a book by its cover", there will be a mini-contest, with five people vying for a title, such as "Prettiest schoolgirl"; invited celebrities are again asked to guess which one of them will be the eventual winner. The winner is usually picked by a panel of experts.

Many Taiwanese celebrities have been first "discovered" by their participation in this show, such as the winners of the mini-contests held in the segment "Do not judge a book by its cover". Some budding Taiwanese artistes have also used this show as a launching pad for their hosting or singing careers. Lastly, invited Taiwanese celebrities used the show to promote their latest albums, books, shows, etc.

Awards and nominations

References

External links
  CTV Guess official homepage (2011 to present)
  CTV Guess former official homepage

Taiwan Television original programming
1996 Taiwanese television series debuts
2012 Taiwanese television series endings
1990s Taiwanese television series
2000s Taiwanese television series
2010s Taiwanese television series
Taiwanese variety shows